Claudine at School (French: Claudine à l'école) is a 1937 French comedy film directed by Serge de Poligny and starring Max Dearly, Pierre Brasseur and Suzet Maïs. It is an adaptation of the 1900 novel of the same title by Colette.

The film's sets were designed by the art director Jacques Krauss.

Cast
 Max Dearly as Le père de Claudine 
 Pierre Brasseur as Le docteur Dubois 
 Suzet Maïs as Aimée Lanthenay 
 Blanchette Brunoy as Claudine 
 Marcel Mouloudji as Mouloud 
 Zélie Yzelle as Mélie 
 Katia Lova as La grande Anaïs 
 Jacqueline Dumonceau as Une des soeurs Jaubert 
 Yvonne Broussard as Une des soeurs Jaubert 
 Élyane Soler as Marie Belhomme 
 Solange Turenne as Luce 
 Jacqueline Valerio as La petite Soulié 
 Ketty Pierson as Junon 
 Christiane Rénal as La paysanne 
 Georges Colin as Dutertre 
 Léon Larive as Rabastens 
 Marcel Charvey as Duplessis 
 Auguste Bovério as Le docteur Lebarbu 
 René Bussy as Le parlementaire 
 Louis Gouget as Un examinateur 
 Fred Marche as L'huissier 
 Moret as Le maître-nageur 
 Raymond Rognoni as Un examinateur 
 Jeanne Fusier-Gir as Mademoiselle Griset 
 Margo Lion as Mademoiselle Sergent

References

Bibliography 
 Dayna Oscherwitz & MaryEllen Higgins. The A to Z of French Cinema. Scarecrow Press, 2009.
 Goble, Alan. The Complete Index to Literary Sources in Film. Walter de Gruyter, 1999.

External links 
 

1937 films
1930s historical comedy films
French historical comedy films
1930s French-language films
Films directed by Serge de Poligny
Films set in the 1900s
1937 comedy films
1930s French films